Tallinn Department Store is a department store in Tallinn, Estonia. The store owner is Tallinna Kaubamaja Group.

The store was opened in 1960. In 1973, the extension (nowadays B-block) was completed, and selling area was doubled.

In 2008, the chain of Kaubamaja shoe stores expanded, because Tallinna Kaubamaja had bought the stores of Suurtüki Naha- ja Kingaäri and ABC Kinga. ABC King has been selling shoes and clothing accessories since 1993. Today, they have grown into a chain of shoe stores with stores in all major shopping centers in Tallinn, Tartu and Pärnu.

In 2017, the architectural competition for the new store building was won by competition work "CITY BREAK".

References

External links
 

1960 establishments in Estonia
Buildings and structures in Tallinn
Shopping centres in Estonia
Shopping malls established in 1960
Tourist attractions in Tallinn